The Alternate Blues is a 1980 album featuring the trumpeters Dizzy Gillespie, Clark Terry, and Freddie Hubbard, supported by a quartet led by Oscar Peterson. It was recorded at Group IV Studios, Los Angeles on March 10, 1980. With one exception, the tracks were previously unissued recordings from The Trumpet Summit Meets the Oscar Peterson Big 4.

Track listing 
 "Alternate Blues": Alternate One – 5:33
 "Alternate Blues": Alternate Two – 8:04
 "Alternate Blues": Alternate Three – 9:05
 "Alternate Blues": Alternate Four – 9:36
 "Wrap Your Troubles in Dreams (And Dream Your Troubles Away)" (Harry Barris, Ted Koehler, Billy Moll) – 8:55
 Ballad Medley: "Here's That Rainy Day"/"The Gypsy"/"If I Should Lose You" (Jimmy Van Heusen, Johnny Burke)/(Billy Reid)/(Ralph Rainger, Leo Robin) – 7:37

Personnel 
 Oscar Peterson – piano
 Dizzy Gillespie - trumpet
 Clark Terry – trumpet, flugelhorn
 Freddie Hubbard - trumpet, flugelhorn
 Joe Pass – guitar
 Ray Brown – bass
 Bobby Durham – drums

Source:

References 

1980 albums
Oscar Peterson albums
Freddie Hubbard albums
Clark Terry albums
Dizzy Gillespie albums
Albums produced by Norman Granz
Pablo Records albums